Syed Fasih Iqbal, also spelled as Syed Faseih Iqbal, was a Pakistani senator and journalist. He was the founder and editor-in-chief of The Balochistan Times, an English-language newspaper based in Quetta; Zamana and Balochistan Timesand. He also served as a president of Council of Pakistan Newspaper Editors (CPNE).

Fasih was born on 10 January 1936 in Allahabad. He attended the University of the Punjab and received BA degree in journalism.

He served as a member of the Senate of Pakistan between 1985 and 1988. In March 1988, he was re-elected as a senator and served until March 1994.

He died in 2014 after a brief illness.

References

Pakistani journalists
Members of the Senate of Pakistan
Pakistani newspaper founders
University of the Punjab alumni
1936 births
2014 deaths